Tareq Ahmed Rashed Khameis Al-Khodaim Al-Antali (Arabic:طارق الخديم) (born 19 May 1990) is an Emirati international footballer who plays as a midfielder for Emirati club Ajman.

International career

International goals
Scores and results list the United Arab Emirates' goal tally first.

References

External links
 

1990 births
Living people
Emirati footballers
Association football midfielders
Al-Wasl F.C. players
Dibba FC players
Al Wahda FC players
Sharjah FC players
Khor Fakkan Sports Club players
Ajman Club players
UAE Pro League players
UAE First Division League players
United Arab Emirates international footballers